United States gubernatorial elections were held in 12 states (including a recall election in Wisconsin on June 5) and two territories. Of the eight Democratic and four Republican seats contested, only that of North Carolina changed party hands, giving the Republicans a net gain of one governorship. These elections (except for Wisconsin) coincided with the presidential election on November 6, 2012.

Election predictions

Race summary

States

Territories

Closest races 
States where the margin of victory was under 1%:
 Puerto Rico, 0.60%

States where the margin of victory was under 5%:
 Montana, 1.56%
 Indiana, 2.93%
 Washington, 3.07%
 West Virginia, 4.84%

States where the margin of victory was under 10%:
 American Samoa, 5.88%
 Wisconsin, 6.80%

Red denotes states won by Republicans. Blue denotes states won by Democrats. Grey denotes states won by Independents.

Delaware 

Governor Jack Markell successfully ran for re-election. His Republican challenger was Jeff Cragg.

Indiana 

Governor Mitch Daniels was term-limited in 2012.

Mike Pence, a six-term Republican in the U.S. House of Representatives, announced his candidacy for his party's nomination. Pence, whose announcement was anticipated by his resignation of a leading position in the GOP caucus in the House, was regarded as the favorite for election. Indianapolis businessman and former Hamilton County Councilman Jim Wallace had announced his candidacy for the Republican nomination prior to Pence's entrance but failed to collect enough signatures to become an official candidate by the deadline in February 2012.

Former state House Speaker John R. Gregg was unopposed for the Democratic Party's nomination.

Former Survivor contestant and founder of the Rupert's Kids charity Rupert Boneham ran as the Libertarian Party candidate.

Pence narrowly defeated Gregg with 49.9% of the vote to Gregg's 46.56%. Boneham received 3.95% of the vote.

Missouri 

Governor Jay Nixon sought re-election.

Dave Spence, a businessman from St. Louis, won the Republican nomination over attorney Bill Randles in the August 7, 2012 primary.

Jim Higgins was the Libertarian candidate.

Nixon won the general election over Spence and Higgins.

The Lieutenant Governor is elected separately.

Montana 

Governor Brian Schweitzer was term-limited in 2012.

The declared Democratic primary candidates were state Senator Larry Jent and state Attorney General Steve Bullock.

The declared Republican primary candidates included Chouteau County commissioner Jim O'Hara, former state Senators Corey Stapleton and Ken Miller, terrorism and national security analyst Neil Livingstone, former Congressman Rick Hill, and Truck driver Keith Winkler.

Steve Bullock and Rick Hill won their respective primaries. Bullock defeated Hill and Libertarian Ron Vandevender in the general election.

New Hampshire 

Governor John Lynch retired rather than running for re-election.

Maggie Hassan, former Majority Leader of the New Hampshire State Senate, defeated former state senator Jackie Cilley and firefighter Bill Kennedy to become the Democratic nominee.  Former Chairman of the New Hampshire Board of Education Ovide Lamontagne, who narrowly lost the Republican primary for Senate in 2010, defeated conservative activist and former state representative Kevin Smith and Bill Tarr to win the Republican nomination.  Hassan won the general election.

New Hampshire does not have a position of Lieutenant Governor.

North Carolina 

Governor Beverly Perdue retired rather than run for re-election.

Walter Dalton and Pat McCrory won their respective primaries, and McCrory won the general election.

The Lieutenant Governor of North Carolina was elected separately.

North Dakota 

Governor Jack Dalrymple succeeded John Hoeven after the latter was elected Senator and ran for a full term in 2012. Drew Wrigley was his running mate.  Dalrymple defeated architect Paul Sorum for the nomination.

State Senate Minority leader Ryan Taylor was the Democratic nominee.  Ellen Chaffee was his running mate. Dalrymple won the general election.

Utah 

Governor Gary Herbert, who won the 2010 gubernatorial special election to finish his predecessor's unfinished term, ran for a full four-year term in 2012.

Democrat Peter Cooke, a businessman and retired major general, opposed him. The Libertarian candidate was medical researcher Ken Larson, and the Constitution party candidate was Kirk D. Pearson. Herbert won the general election.

Vermont 

Governor Peter Shumlin, the victor of the Vermont gubernatorial election of 2010, ran for re-election in 2012. His Republican challenger was state Senator Randy Brock. Shumlin won the general election.
 
The Lieutenant Governor was elected separately.

Washington 

Governor Christine Gregoire retired rather than run for re-election.

U.S. Representative Jay Inslee was the Democratic nominee.

State Attorney General Rob McKenna was the Republican nominee. U.S. Representative Dave Reichert decided against a bid, and threw his support to McKenna. Inslee won the general election.

The Lieutenant Governor will be elected separately.

West Virginia 

The Supreme Court of Appeals of West Virginia ruled on January 18, 2011 that the state must hold a special gubernatorial election in 2011 to fill the vacancy resulting from Joe Manchin's election to the United States Senate. The special election occurred October 4, 2011 with state Senate President and acting Governor Earl Ray Tomblin won the election. Tomblin was eligible to run for a full term in 2012.

Tomblin's 2011 Republican opponent, businessman Bill Maloney, was the Republican nominee. Tomblin won the election.

David Moran was the Libertarian candidate.

The Lieutenant Governor is elected by the State Senate.

Wisconsin (recall) 

Governor Scott Walker (R) survived a recall election on June 5. Walker's disapproval ratings varied between 50–51% while his approval ratings varied between 47–49% in 2011. Walker led against challenger Tom Barrett (D) in polls since March, including two post-primary polls which showed Walker with a five to twelve point lead. Walker defeated Barrett by seven percentage points, becoming the first governor in U.S. history to survive a recall election.

Territories

American Samoa 

Governor Togiola Tulafono, who had served as Governor since 2003, was ineligible to run for re-election due to term limits.

Six candidates vied to succeed outgoing Governor Tulafono – former President of American Samoa Community College, Salu Hunkin-Finau; businessman Timothy Jones; former Attorney General Afoa Moega Lutu; former President of the Development Bank of American Samoa, Lolo Letalu Matalasi Moliga; Lieutenant Governor Faoa Aitofele Sunia; and former High Court of American Samoa justice Save Liuato Tuitele. Moliga won the general election.

Puerto Rico 

Governor Luis Fortuño (PNP/R) ran for re-election.

Fortuño had been mentioned as a long-shot potential Republican nominee for President or Vice President in 2012. However, he announced on June 26, 2011 that he would run for re-election instead of seeking the Presidency.

Senator Alejandro García Padilla (PPD) was the net biggest challenger out of six challengers, and won the general election.

Puerto Rico does not have a position of Lieutenant Governor.

See also
2012 United States elections
2012 United States presidential election
2012 United States Senate elections
2012 United States House of Representatives elections

Notes

References